Çağlayan Alpsatan (born 5 January 1993) is a Turkish footballer who plays as a midfielder. He made his Süper Lig debut on 7 April 2012.

References

External links
 
 

1993 births
Living people
Turkish footballers
People from Altındağ, Ankara
Association football midfielders
MKE Ankaragücü footballers
Ankaraspor footballers
Darıca Gençlerbirliği footballers
Elazığspor footballers
Gümüşhanespor footballers
Tokatspor footballers
Elazığ Belediyespor players
Muğlaspor footballers
Süper Lig players
TFF Second League players
TFF Third League players
Turkey youth international footballers